Finland was represented by Laila Halme, with the song "Muistojeni laulu", at the 1963 Eurovision Song Contest, which took place on 23 March in London. "Muistojeni laulu" was chosen as the Finnish entry at the national final organised by broadcaster Yle and held on 14 February. Halme originally finished third in the national final, but replaced the winning singer Irmeli Mäkelä at Eurovision for unknown reasons.

Before Eurovision

National final
The final was held at the Yle studios in Helsinki, hosted by Aarno Walli, Erkki-Mikael, Risto Vanari and Marion Rung. Eight songs took part, with each performed twice, once with a small combo and once with a full orchestra. The winner was chosen by voting from ten regional juries.

At Eurovision 
On the night of the final Halme performed 7th in the running order, following Italy and preceding eventual contest winners Denmark. Voting was by each national jury awarding 5-4-3-2-1 to their top five songs, and at the close "Muistojeni laulu" was one of four songs (along with the entries from the Netherlands, Norway and Sweden) which had failed to pick up any points at all, the country's first last place finish. The Finnish jury awarded its 5 points to Denmark.

Voting 
Finland did not receive any points at the 1963 Eurovision Song Contest.

References 

1963
Countries in the Eurovision Song Contest 1963
Eurovision